Gallen Lo Ka-leung is a Hong Kong actor and singer who primarily acts in television series. He is sometimes credited as King Gallen or Law Ka-leung.

Career
Lo started his television career in 1984 at ATV. He received short-term success in acting ATV and singing theme songs for some ATV series. Lo left ATV for rival TVB, but his career did not bloom until 1996, when he was cast in the series Old Time Buddy in 1997 and Secret of the Heart in 1998. Lo won TVB's Best Actor Award three times (1997, 1998, 2002).

In 2003, Lo left TVB and started to focusing on acting and making commercials in Mainland China.

On February 24, 2021, Lo has finished another drama shooting in Mainland China and shared on his Weibo commemorating the completion of his 100th TV series in his career.

Personal life

Lo married with Clare Fong Man-yee, a woman with whom he worked in a non-acting role at TVB, in 1998. Their son was born in 1999. The couple divorced in 2007.

On 30 Jan 2009, he was engaged to mainland actress (Sophie) Su Yan in Beijing, and had registered his marriage with Su Yan on 9 Sep 2009. Their daughter was born in 2013.

Filmography

Film

Television

Awards and titles
TVB Anniversary Awards 1997 Best Actor ~ Old Time Buddy
TVB Anniversary Awards 1998 My Favourite Actor in a Leading Role ~ Secrets of the Heart
TVB Anniversary Awards 1999 My Favourite On-Screen Partners ( Dramas ) ~ Feminine Masculinity ( with Flora Chan )
TVB Anniversary Awards 2000 My Top 10 Favourite Television Characters ~ At the Threshold of an Era 2
TVB Anniversary Awards 2001 My Top 13 Favourite Television Characters ~ Seven Sisters
TVB Anniversary Awards 2002 My Favourite Actor in a Leading Role ~ Golden Faith
TVB Anniversary Awards 2002 My Top 12 Favourite Television Characters ~ Golden Faith
Fung-Wan III - The 3rd Top Chinese TV Drama Award 2007 Most Favourite Hong Kong/Taiwan Actor

Discography
At Point Blank
At The Threshold of An Era 1
At The Threshold of An Era 2 (創世紀 II)
Seven Sisters
Secret of the Heart
Time's Fairytale, opening theme song for Golden Faith
Sunny Days and When Love Comes to an End, ending theme songs for Golden Faith and The W Files
On the Verge of Eternity, opening theme song for Born Rich

References

External links

|-
!colspan="3" style="background: #DAA520;" | TVB Anniversary Awards

1962 births
Living people
Hong Kong male film actors
Hong Kong male singers
TVB veteran actors
New Talent Singing Awards contestants
Hong Kong people of Hakka descent
20th-century Hong Kong male actors
21st-century Hong Kong male actors
Hong Kong male television actors